The party leadership of the United States Senate refers to the officials elected by the Senate Democratic Caucus and the Senate Republican Conference to manage the affairs of each party in the Senate. Each party is led by a floor leader who directs the legislative agenda of their caucus in the Senate, and who is augmented by an Assistant Leader or Whip, and several other officials who work together to manage the floor schedule of legislation, enforce party discipline, and oversee efforts to maintain and grow the party's seats in the Senate.

The constitutionally-defined Senate leadership roles are the Vice President of the United States, who serves as President of the Senate, and the President pro tempore, traditionally the seniormost member of the majority, who theoretically presides in the absence of the Vice President.

Unlike committee chairmanships, leadership positions are not traditionally conferred on the basis of seniority, but are elected in closed-door caucuses.

Democratic Leadership
Since January 20, 2021, the Democratic Party has constituted a majority in the United States Senate.

Presiding Officials

Republican leadership
Since January 20, 2021, the Republican Party has constituted a minority in the United States Senate.

Notes

References

Leaders of the United States Senate
Lists of United States senators